Karl Pratt (born 18 July 1980) is an English former professional rugby league footballer who played in the 1990s and 2000s. He played at representative level for Great Britain, England and Yorkshire, and at club level for Featherstone Rovers (Heritage № 760), Leeds Rhinos (Heritage № 1306), and Bradford Bulls (with whom he won the 2003 Super League Grand Final and Challenge Cup).

Career
Pratt started his amateur career with Hunslet Parkside. At the age of 15, he trained with hometown team Leeds, but was not taken on by the club. He signed for Featherstone Rovers in 1997, and spent two seasons at the club, scoring 30 tries in 48 appearances. 	Karl Pratt made his début for Featherstone Rovers on Sunday 8 June 1997, and he played his last match for Feartherstone Rovers during the 1998 season, he played , i.e. number 5, in Featherstone Rovers's 22–24 defeat by Wakefield Trinity in the 1998 First Division Grand Final at McAlpine Stadium, Huddersfield on 26 September 1998. In November 1998, he returned to Leeds after being signed for a fee worth up to £150,000.

Pratt won caps for England while at Leeds Rhinos 2001 Wales (sub), and won caps for Great Britain while at Leeds Rhinos 2002 Australia, and New Zealand.

Pratt played for the Bradford Bulls at stand-off half back in their 2003 Super League Grand Final victory against the Wigan Warriors. Having won Super League VIII, Bradford played against 2003 NRL Premiers, the Penrith Panthers in the 2004 World Club Challenge. Pratt played at scrum half back in the Bulls' 22–4 victory. He played for Bradford from the interchange bench in their 2004 Super League Grand Final loss against the Leeds Rhinos.

In 2005, Pratt announced his retirement at the age of 25 due to a persistent shoulder injury.

References

External links
(archived by web.archive.org) 1st XIII Profile at therhinos
Profile at therhinos

1980 births
Living people
Bradford Bulls players
England national rugby league team players
English rugby league players
Featherstone Rovers players
Great Britain national rugby league team players
Leeds Rhinos players
Rugby league five-eighths
Rugby league halfbacks
Rugby league hookers
Rugby league players from Leeds
Rugby league wingers
Yorkshire rugby league team players